The 2004 Australian Drivers' Championship was an Australian motor racing competition open to Formula 4000 cars. It was the 48th Australian Drivers' Championship and the sixteen and last to be contested by Formula Holden / Formula Brabham / Formula 4000 cars. The championship winner was awarded the 2004 CAMS Gold Star and the Silver Star Trophy was awarded to the winner of the "Silver Star" class which was restricted to approved competitors.

The championship, which was promoted as the 2004 Holden Australian Drivers' Championship, was dominated by reigning Australian Formula Ford Champion Neil McFadyen. McFadyn won six of the eight races and took second place at each of the two Winton Motor Raceway races behind International Formula 3000 returnee Rob Nguyen. With only one race finish off the podium, but no wins, Ty Hanger was the runner up ahead of Nguyen.

Calendar
The championship was contested over a four-round series with two races per round.

The winner of each round (for presentation purposes only) was determined by the aggregation of Championship points awarded in that round.

Points system
Gold Start points were awarded on a 20–15–12–10–8–6–4–3–2–1 basis to the first ten outright finishers in each race. 
Silver Star points were awarded on a 20–15–12–10–8–6–4–3–2–1 basis to the first ten Silver Star class finishers in each race.

Standings

References

Further reading
 Australian Title Conditions, CAMS Manual of Motor Sport, 2004
 Official Program, Mallala Power Surge 2004, Sunday 9 May

External links
 www.f4000.com.au, as archived at web.archive.org
 Online Race Results at www.natsoft.com.au

Australian Drivers' Championship
Drivers' Championship
Formula Holden
Australian Drivers